Manuel Komnenos Raoul was a Byzantine aristocrat and official.

A member of the aristocratic Raoul/Rales family, Manuel was a son of the protovestiarios Alexios Raoul. His father was a senior military leader under the Nicaean emperor John III Vatatzes (r. 1222–1254), but fell out of favour with his successor, Theodore II Laskaris (r. 1254–1258), who distrusted the aristocracy and promoted men of humble origin like George Mouzalon, who became his chief minister. Theodore II's marrying one of Manuel's sisters to George's brother, Andronikos Mouzalon, was regarded as an insult, and the family became opponents of the emperor, who at some point had all of Alexios' sons thrown into prison. As a result, the Raoul family actively supported the murder of the Mouzalon brothers in 1258, following Theodore II's death, and the subsequent usurpation of Michael VIII Palaiologos (r. 1259–1282).

As a reward, Michael VIII appointed Alexios' eldest son, John Raoul Petraliphas, as protovestiarios, while Manuel was made pinkernes. In 1276, Manuel was appointed governor in Thessaly. Shortly after, however, Manuel and his brother Isaac became opposed to the emperor's efforts to secure the Union of the Churches and supported the anti-unionist Patriarch Arsenios Autoreianos. As a result, Manuel was arrested in 1279, and in 1280 he was blinded and exiled to Kenchreai on the Skamandros River.

References

Sources
 
 
 

13th-century Byzantine people
Byzantine governors
Byzantine prisoners and detainees
People of the Empire of Nicaea
Manuel Komnenos
Year of birth unknown
Year of death unknown
Prisoners and detainees of the Byzantine Empire